Dodsland is a village in the Canadian province of Saskatchewan within the Rural Municipality of Winslow No. 319 and Census Division No. 13.

History 
Dodsland incorporated as a village on August 23, 1913.

Demographics 

Notable people

 Ed Chynoweth, Hockey Hall of Fame executive, president of the Western Hockey League and Canadian Hockey League, namesake of the Ed Chynoweth Cup
 Don Gillen, played in the NHL for the Philadelphia Flyers and Hartford Whalers
 Bob Hoffmeyer, Former NHL defenceman 
 Brad McCrimmon, Former NHL defenceman and coach, Stanley Cup Champion (1989), killed in the 2011 Lokomotiv Yaroslavl plane crash

See also 

 List of communities in Saskatchewan
 Villages of Saskatchewan

Footnotes

Villages in Saskatchewan
Winslow No. 319, Saskatchewan
Division No. 13, Saskatchewan